Japhie Malève Nguia (born 24 March 1992) is a Congolese professional basketball player.  He last played for Inter Club Brazzaville of the FIBA Africa Clubs Champions Cup.

He represented Congo's national basketball team at the 2013 AfroBasket in Abidjan, Ivory Coast.

References

External links
 AfroBasket Profile
 FIBA Profile
2015 FIBA Africa Cup for Men's Clubs

1992 births
Living people
Republic of the Congo men's basketball players
Sportspeople from Brazzaville
Point guards